Hewitsonia prouvosti is a butterfly in the family Lycaenidae. It is found in central Cameroon.

References

Endemic fauna of Cameroon
Butterflies described in 1997
Poritiinae